A Story of People in War and Peace is a 2007 Armenian documentary film about Armenian filmmaker Vardan Hovhannisyan's understanding of the human costs of war. Prompted by a question from his son, Hovhannisyan embarks on a journey to find his surviving trench mates from the first Nagorno-Karabakh War of the early nineties with neighboring Azerbaijan and examines the lasting effects of the war during a time of peace. Timely and universal, A Story of People in War and Peace wrestles with the question of how to maintain dignity in the face of terror.
Tribeca Film Festival Executive Director Peter Scarlet comments '...what the film offers is something quite remarkable: it's made by a filmmaker who covered the war at the time, and who inter-cuts his old footage with interviews he's filmed now with the surviving soldiers ... it succeeds heartbreakingly in driving home the fact that somehow we know that nothing justifies the fact of taking the precious, irreplaceable life of even a single human being.’

Historians cite the Karabagh war (1989–1994) as one of the first signs of the Soviet Union's collapse. Vardan Hovhannisyan, front line journalist and former prisoner of war, Vardan Hovhannisyan, lived alongside soldiers, doctors, nurses, villagers, and children caught in the conflict, capturing their immediate thoughts, impressions and last words to their families. He spent years processing his war experience before finally making A Story of People in War and Peace. He does not emphasize the political side of the conflict, but the psychological effects the war had on the young soldiers. He juxtaposes chaotic and terse frontline images of 12 years ago with panoramic shots in fixed frames of the beautiful scenery today. But all this calm is an illusion, as one soldier puts it.'
–International Documentary Festival Amsterdam (IDFA).

The film has won numerous awards and has been shown in film festivals all over the world including IDFA (Amsterdam), Barcelona Film Festival, One World Film Festival (Prague), Doc Aviv (Tel Aviv), Al-Jazeera Film Festival, Zagreb Film Festival, Hot Docs (Toronto), Belfast Film Festival and Tribeca Film Festival (NY), Mexico International Film Festival (Rosarito), etc.

Awards and nominations
 Tribeca Film Festival, NY - Best New Documentary Filmmaker
 IDFA - Nomination for the Joris Ivens Award at the FIPRESCI prize
 Mexico Festival - Special Jury Prize
 Trieste Film Festival - Audience award
 ZagrebDox  Film Festival - Special Mention in the International competition
 Docaviv Film Festival - Special mention award
 Golden Apricot Film Festival - Best Intl. Documentary
 DOCSDF Intl Doc Film Fest in Mexico – Special mention of the jury
 Saratov Film Festival, Russia - Special mention of the jury
 Cancun Riviera Maya International Film Festival - Best Documentary
 Asia Pacific Screen Awards - nomination for Best Documentary Feature Film
 Amnesty International Film Festival - Movies that Matter Foundation Nomination
 Golden Apricot Film Festival - Silver Prize Armenian Panorama
 War Film Festival Russia – Best Documentary

External links
 
 

Armenian-language films
Documentary films about war
Armenian documentary films
Films directed by Vardan Hovhannisyan
2007 films
2007 documentary films
Nagorno-Karabakh War films